First Nations Lacrosse Association (formerly Iroquois Lacrosse Association) is the governing body of lacrosse for First Nations within Canada and Native American tribes within the United States. The First Nations Lacrosse Association (FNLA) oversees five national teams, the Iroquois men's national lacrosse team, the Iroquois men's national under-19 lacrosse team, the Haudenosaunee women's national lacrosse team, the Haudenosaunee women's national under-19 lacrosse team, and the Iroquois national indoor lacrosse team. These teams are recognized by World Lacrosse for international competition, making them the only indigenous peoples' national teams sanctioned in any sport.

The men's teams are known as the Iroquois Nationals and the women's teams the Haudenosaunee Nationals. Iroquois is the name for the Iroquois people originated by European colonists and Haudenosaunee is their name in their own Iroquoian languages. 

FNLA also sanctions three men's box lacrosse leagues: Can-Am Senior B Lacrosse League, Three Nations Senior Lacrosse League, and First Nations Junior B Lacrosse League.

Iroqouis Nationals 
The Iroquois Nationals men's lacrosse team was formed and sanctioned by the Grand Council of the Haudenosaunee in 1983 in preparation of friendlies at the NCAA championship in Baltimore, Maryland.  The Nationals lost to Syracuse Orange 28-5 and Hobart College 22-14.  Prior to the 1984 Summer Olympics, the Nationals held the Jim Thorpe Memorial Games and Pow-Wow, a 6-team event with local and international teams in Los Angeles.  The Nationals achieved their first victory over the national team of England. The following year, using their Haudenosaunee passports, the Nationals traveled and toured England losing only once.

After being denied membership by the ILF to compete in the 1986 World Games in Canada, the Iroquois hosted the teams for preliminary games at the University of Buffalo. In 1988, the IFL accepted the Iroquois as a full member nation.

The Iroquois Nationals took part in their first international competition at the 1990 World Lacrosse Championships, finishing fifth.  The first FIL sanctioned U17 box lacrosse friendly took place between the Iroquois Nationals and Team Canada during the 2015 World Indoor Lacrosse Championship.

Nike deal
In 2006, the Iroquois Nationals Lacrosse Program signed a partnership with Nike, Inc. in which Nike will provide the Nationals with their brand uniforms, clothing, footwear, and other equipment. The company is to develop programs to "promote wellness-and-fitness activities in Native American communities throughout the region", and team members may go to speak to local groups. Team members will also assist in testing of sustainable produced sportswear for Nike's research and development of processes to use non-toxic dyes and biodegradable organic cotton.

Nike is the only Fortune 500 company to have such a relationship with a Native American organization, and the Iroquois Nationals are the only such group.

Passport issues
The Nationals were unable to attend and compete in the 2010 World Lacrosse Championship in England as the United Kingdom does not accept their Iroquois passports. The Nationals were forced to forfeit their three preliminary games. In 2015, the Haudenosaunee Nationals women's under 19 team was forced to withdraw from the 2015 U19 World Lacrosse Championship in Scotland for the same reason.

Field lacrosse
The Iroquois Nationals are the national team representing the Haudenosaunee Confederacy. First recognized by the Federation of International Lacrosse as a full member nation in 1987, the Nationals competed in their first tournament at the 1990 World Lacrosse Championship, finishing fifth.

Results

Box lacrosse

2015 WILC
The Iroquois Nationals played host to the 2015 FIL World Indoor Lacrosse Championships for the first time in the tournament’s history. The event took place on Haudenosaunee Territories at Tsha’Hon’nonyen’dakhwa’ Onondaga Nation Arena and the Carrier Dome near Syracuse, as well as the First Niagara Center in Buffalo September 18–27, 2015.

Leagues
 Can-Am Senior B Lacrosse League, founded in 1969 as North American Lacrosse Association, was organized beginning in 1978. League winners compete for the Presidents Cup, the Senior B championship of North America. Can-Am teams have won the championship five times (1994, 1996, 2000, 2010, 2014).
 Formed in 1994, the Three Nations Senior Lacrosse League is a Senior B box lacrosse league. TNSLL teams compete for the Presidents Cup, winning the championship on five occasions (1994, 1995, 1997, 2011, 2012).
 First Nations Junior B Lacrosse League is a box lacrosse league formed in 2014 with the restructuring of the Canadian Lacrosse Association. Four teams competed in the inaugural season. In 2015 the league merged with the Montreal Junior Lacrosse League to form a seven-team league. The FNLA league winner earns a spot in the Founders Cup, the national championship of Junior B lacrosse in Canada.

See also
Mike Kanentakeron Mitchell, Iroquois Lacrosse Association founder

References

External links
 Iroquois Nationals
 First Nations Junior B Lacrosse League
 @FirstNationsLax Twitter

Lacrosse of the Iroquois Confederacy
Lacrosse governing bodies of Canada
Lacrosse governing bodies of the United States
First Nations sportspeople